Alexey Fadeyev; born December 10, 1977) is a Russian nordic combined athlete who competed from 1998 to 2002. He won a bronze medal in the 4 x 5 km team event at the 1999 FIS Nordic World Ski Championships in Ramsau and finished 8th in the 15 km individual at those same championships.

Fadeyev finished 31st in the 15 km individual event at the 2002 Winter Olympics in Salt Lake City. His best individual career finish was 2nd in a 7.5 km sprint event in Planica, Slovenia in 2001.

External links

Russian male Nordic combined skiers
Nordic combined skiers at the 1998 Winter Olympics
Nordic combined skiers at the 2002 Winter Olympics
Olympic Nordic combined skiers of Russia
1977 births
Living people
FIS Nordic World Ski Championships medalists in Nordic combined